The 2011 Scottish Parliament election was held on Thursday, 5 May 2011 to elect 129 members to the Scottish Parliament.

The election delivered the first majority government since the opening of Holyrood, a remarkable feat as the Additional Member System used to elect MSPs was allegedly originally implemented to prevent any party achieving an overall parliamentary majority. The Scottish National Party (SNP) won a landslide of 69 seats, the most the party has ever held at either a Holyrood or Westminster election, allowing leader Alex Salmond to remain as First Minister of Scotland for a second term. The SNP gained 32 constituencies, twenty two from Scottish Labour, nine from the Scottish Liberal Democrats and one from the Scottish Conservatives. Such was the scale of their gains that, of the 73 constituencies in Scotland, only 20 came to be represented by MSPs of other political parties. Scottish Labour lost seven seats and suffered their worst election defeat in Scotland since 1931, with huge losses in their traditional Central Belt constituencies and for the first time having to rely on the regional lists to elect members within these areas. They did, however, remain the largest opposition party. Party leader Iain Gray announced his resignation following his party's disappointing result.  The Scottish Liberal Democrats were soundly defeated; their popular vote share was cut in half and their seat total reduced from 16 to 5. Tavish Scott announced his resignation as party leader shortly after the election. For Scottish Conservatives, the election proved disappointing as their popular vote dropped slightly and their number of seats fell by 2, with party leader Annabel Goldie also announcing her resignation.

During the campaign, the four main party leaders engaged in a series of televised debates, as they had in every previous general election. These key debates were held on 29 March (STV), 1 May (BBC), and 3 May (STV). The results of the election were broadcast live on BBC Scotland and STV, on the night of the election.

It was the fourth general election since the devolved parliament was established in 1999 and was held on the same day as elections to the National Assembly for Wales and the Northern Ireland Assembly, as well as English local elections and the UK-wide referendum on the alternative vote.

Date
Under the Scotland Act 1998, an ordinary general election to the Scottish Parliament was held on the first Thursday in May four years after the 2007 election.

Because of the problems of voter confusion and a high number of spoilt ballots in 2007 due to holding Scottish parliamentary and local elections simultaneously and under different voting systems, the next Scottish local elections were held in 2012 instead of 2011. This policy decision was contradicted, however, by the staging of the Alternative Vote referendum on 5 May 2011 as well. Labour MP Ian Davidson expressed opposition to the referendum being staged on the same date as other elections. Scottish Secretary Michael Moore stated that having the referendum on another date would cost an additional £17 million.

British, Irish, Commonwealth and European Union citizens living in Scotland who were aged 18 or over on election day were entitled to vote. The deadline to register to vote in the election was midnight on Friday 15 April 2011, though anyone who qualified as an anonymous elector had until midnight on Tuesday 26 April 2011 to register.

It was held on the same day as elections for Northern Ireland's 26 local councils, the Northern Irish Assembly and Welsh Assembly elections, a number of local elections in England and the United Kingdom Alternative Vote referendum.

Boundary Review

The table below shows the notional figures for seats won by each party at the last election. The Conservatives have been the biggest gainers as a result of the boundary changes, winning an extra three seats, while Labour has lost the most seats, losing two overall.

Election system, seats, and regions
The total number of Members of the Scottish Parliament (MSPs) elected to the Parliament is 129.

The First Periodical Review of the Scottish Parliament constituencies and electoral regions by the Boundary Commission for Scotland was announced on 3 July 2007. The Commission published its provisional proposals for the regional boundaries in 2009.

The Scottish Parliament uses an Additional Members System, designed to produce approximate proportional representation for each region.
There are 8 regions each sub-divided into smaller constituencies.
There are a total of 73 constituencies.
Each constituency elects one (MSP) by the plurality (first past the post) system of election.
Each region elects seven additional member MSPs using an additional member system.
A modified D'Hondt method, using the constituency results, is used to calculate which additional member MSPs the regions elect.

The Scottish Parliament constituencies have not been coterminous with Scottish Westminster constituencies since the 2005 general election, when the 72 former Westminster constituencies were replaced with a new set of 59, generally larger, constituencies (see Scottish Parliament (Constituencies) Act 2004).

For details of the Revised proposals for constituencies at the Next Scottish Parliament election - Scottish Parliament constituencies and electoral regions from 2011

The Boundary Commission have also recommended changes to the electoral regions used to elect "list" members of the Scottish Parliament. The recommendations can be summarised below;

Glasgow was reduced from 10 constituency seats to 9. Glasgow Govan was largely replaced by Glasgow Southside. The seats of Glasgow Maryhill, Glasgow Springburn and Glasgow Baillieston were abolished and their territory was divided between the newly created Glasgow Maryhill and Springburn and Glasgow Provan, as well as the existing Glasgow Shettleston seat which was moved eastwards.
Highlands and Islands retained 8 constituency seats. Caithness, Sutherland and Easter Ross was replaced with the larger Caithness, Sutherland and Ross seat. Ross, Skye and Inverness West and Inverness East, Nairn and Lochaber were abolished with most of their area being divided between Skye, Lochaber and Badenoch and Inverness and Nairn.
West of Scotland was renamed West Scotland. It was increased from 9 constituency seats to 10, as Cunninghame South was transferred from the South Scotland region. The seats of Paisley North, Paisley South and West Renfrewshire were abolished and their area was divided between the new seats of Paisley, Renfrewshire North and West and Renfrewshire South
Central Scotland was reduced from 10 constituency seats to 9, as the territory of Kilmarnock and Loudoun was transferred to South Scotland. Some territory to the south was also transferred to South Scotland, reducing the land area of East Kilbride. Hamilton North and Bellshill was largely replaced by Uddingston and Bellshill. Hamilton South was largely replaced by Hamilton, Larkhall and Stonehouse.
Lothians was renamed Lothian and retained 9 constituency seats. The seat of Midlothian was split, with its southern areas transferred to South Scotland. Its northern parts merged with Musselburgh to form Midlothian North and Musselburgh. Edinburgh East and Musselburgh, thus with Musselburgh removed, was replaced by Edinburgh Eastern. The seats of Edinburgh North and Leith, Edinburgh South and Edinburgh West were respectively renamed Edinburgh Northern and Leith, Edinburgh Southern and Edinburgh Western while redrawn. In West Lothian, Livingston was replaced by Almond Valley, which traded territory with the retained Linlithgow seat.
Mid Scotland and Fife retained 9 constituencies. North Tayside was mostly replaced by Perthshire North, with some of the former's territory being transferred to North East Scotland. Ochil was split, with its eastern parts merging with the former seat of Perth to form Perthshire South and Kinross-shire. Clackmannanshire and Dunblane was created, consisting mostly of the more populous western part of Ochil. In Fife, Dunfermline West, Dunfermline East and Fife Central were respectively largely replaced by Dunfermline, Cowdenbeath and Mid Fife and Glenrothes.
North East Scotland was increased from 9 to 10 constituency seats. The seat of Angus was split between two new seats: Angus South, which included territory transferred from Mid Scotland and Fife, and Angus North and Mearns. Both West Aberdeenshire and Kincardine and Gordon were split. The former was divided between the new seat of Aberdeenshire West, Angus North and Mearns and an enlarged Aberdeen South, which under new boundaries was named Aberdeen South and North Kincardine. A redrawn Aberdeen North was renamed Aberdeen Donside. Gordon was split between Aberdeenshire West and another new seat: Aberdeenshire East. Some territory was also traded with Banff and Buchan, which was largely replaced by Banffshire and Buchan Coast. The two Dundee seats were redrawn and renamed from Dundee West and Dundee East to Dundee City West and Dundee City East.
South of Scotland was renamed South Scotland. It retained 9 constituencies, losing Cunninghame South to West Scotland but gaining the new Kilmarnock and Irvine Valley constituency, which replaced the previous constituency of Kilmarnock and Loudoun. Some territory was transferred from Galloway and Upper Nithsdale to Dumfries; the redrawn seats were then renamed Galloway and West Dumfries and Dumfriesshire. Tweeddale, Ettrick and Lauderdale lost territory to Roxburgh and Berwickshire but gained some from the Lothian area to the north. These seats were redrawn and renamed Midlothian South, Tweeddale and Lauderdale and Ettrick, Roxburgh and Berwickshire.

Retiring MSPs
At the dissolution of Parliament on 22 March 2011, twenty MSPs were not seeking re-election.

Campaign

The parliament was dissolved on 22 March 2011 and the campaign began thereafter. The Conservatives saw 3 of their candidates drop out of the election during the period 25–28 March: Malcolm McAskill from the Glasgow regional ballot, Iain Whyte from the Glasgow Maryhill & Springburn constituency ballot and David Meikle from the Glasgow regional ballot.

The Liberal Democrat regional candidate for the Central Scotland region Hugh O'Donnell also withdrew on 27 March, citing discontent with the Conservative-Lib Dem coalition at Westminster. Another Liberal Democrat, John Farquhar Munro, came out in support of Alex Salmond for First Minister, even though he also claimed not to support the SNP. In the Clydesdale constituency, the Liberal Democrat candidate John Paton-Day failed to lodge his papers in time for the nomination deadline, leaving the constituency as the only one in Scotland with no Liberal Democrat candidate. On 17 April, the Scottish Liberal Democrat leader Tavish Scott described himself as 'uncomfortable' with his Scottish party being 'related' to the Conservatives due to the coalition at Westminster.

A televised debate between the four main party leaders was shown on STV on 29 March, with SNP leader Alex Salmond and Conservative leader Annabel Goldie identified as the strongest performers. The Scottish Sun newspaper came out in support of the SNP's campaign to win a second term, even though the newspaper does not back independence.

Whilst campaigning in Glasgow Central station, the Scottish Labour leader Iain Gray was ambushed by a group of anti-cuts protestors who chased him into a nearby fast-food outlet. The same protesters had already targeted Conservative leader Annabel Goldie a month earlier. On 27 April, Iain Gray and SNP leader Alex Salmond were both present simultaneously in an Ardrossan branch of the Asda supermarket chain; both parties alleged that the other party's leader 'ran away' from the possibility of an encounter with the other.

Policy platforms

The main parties contesting the election all outlined the following main aims:

Scottish National Party

 Legislate to give Scotland a referendum on independence.
 Maintain the council tax freeze throughout the next parliament.
 Attempt to generate 100% of Scotland's electricity from renewable sources by 2020.
 Continue offering free university tuition to Scottish students.
 Maintain high police numbers.

Labour

 Introduce Scottish Living Wage of £7.15 an hour, starting in the public sector.
 Abolish youth unemployment and aim to create 250,000 jobs by 2020.
 Compulsory six-month jail sentences for people convicted of knife-carrying.
 Initiate two-year council tax freeze.
 Re-instate the proposed rail link between Glasgow Central station and Glasgow International Airport, which was cancelled in 2009.
Continue free University tuition fees for all Scottish students.

Conservatives

 A council tax freeze during the period 2012–2013.
 Re-introduce prescription charges at 2009 standards (£5 for a single item).
 Consider building new nuclear power stations, but not on new sites.
 Bring in Variable University Graduate Fee, with no more than £4,000 being paid annually per student.
 Replace community service with short prison sentences.
 Centralising the Scottish police forces into a single police force.

Liberal Democrats

 Maintain free university tuition for Scottish students.
 Aim to create 100,000 new jobs through selling off Scottish Water which would free £1.5 billion for investment purposes.
 Oppose moves to create a centralised Scottish police force.
 Maintain the Scottish bus pass, but progressively bring the qualifying age up to 65.
 Reform the council tax.

Greens

 Bring in large-scale ecosystem restoration projects.
 Replace council tax with land value tax.
 Maintain free university tuition for Scottish students.
 Focus on bringing restorative justice within Scotland's justice system.
 Abolish the Forth Replacement Crossing.

Parties contesting the election

Contesting constituency and regional ballot
Only the Scottish National Party, the Scottish Labour Party and the Scottish Conservative Party contested all constituencies.

 Scottish National Party (SNP)
 Scottish Labour
 Scottish Conservatives
 Scottish Liberal Democrats – Contesting all constituencies except Clydesdale
 All Scotland Pensioner's Party/Scottish Senior Citizens Unity Party – Contesting Mid Fife & Glenrothes and Motherwell & Wishaw
 Scottish Christian Party – Contesting Inverness & Nairn and Motherwell & Wishaw
 Liberal Party – Contesting Argyll & Bute
 National Front – Contesting Aberdeen Central, Aberdeen Donside, Aberdeen South & North Kincardine, Almond Valley, Linlithgow and only the North East Scotland region
 UK Independence Party (UKIP) – Contesting Inverness & Nairn, Moray and North East Fife

Contesting regional ballot only
 Scottish Greens
 Solidarity – all regions except Glasgow
 Respect Party 'Coalition Against Cuts' – Glasgow only 
 Scottish Socialist Party
 British National Party (BNP)
 Socialist Labour Party
 Scottish Homeland Party – contesting Glasgow and Central regions
 Pirate Party
 Scottish Unionist Party
 Christian Peoples Alliance
 Ban Bankers Bonuses – contesting the Highlands and Islands and West of Scotland regional lists.

Contesting constituency ballot only
 Communist Party of Britain – Contesting Glasgow Anniesland
 Land Party – Contesting Cowdenbeath

Opinion polls

In March 2011, two months before the election, Labour held a double-digit lead over the SNP in the opinion polls, 44% to 29%. The SNP's support subsequently rallied, with the two parties level in April polling. In the final poll on the eve of the election, the SNP were eleven points clear of Labour.

The chart shows the relative state of the parties since polling began from 2009, until the date of the election. The constituency vote is shown as semi-transparent lines, while the regional vote is shown in full lines.

Result

The election produced a majority SNP government, making this the first time in the Scottish Parliament where a party had commanded a parliamentary majority. The SNP took 16 seats from Labour, many of whose key figures failed to be returned to parliament, although Labour leader Iain Gray retained East Lothian by 151 votes. The SNP took a further eight seats from the Liberal Democrats and one seat from the Conservatives. The SNP overall majority meant that there was sufficient support in the Scottish Parliament to hold a referendum on Scottish independence.

Labour's defeat was attributed to several factors: the party focused too heavily on criticising the Conservative-led coalition at Westminster, and assumed that former Lib Dem voters would automatically switch their vote to Labour, when in fact they appeared to have haemorrhaged support to the SNP. Jackie Baillie compared the result to Labour's performance in the 1983 UK general election. Iain Gray conceded defeat to Alex Salmond and announced his intention to resign as leader of the Labour group of MSPs that autumn.

The election saw a rout of the Liberal Democrats, with no victories in mainland constituencies and 25 lost deposits (candidates gaining less than five per cent of the vote). Leader Tavish Scott said their performance was due to the Liberal Democrats' involvement in the Westminster Government, which had been unpopular with many former LibDem supporters. Scott resigned as leader two days after the election.

For the Conservatives, the main disappointment was the loss of Edinburgh Pentlands, the seat of former party leader David McLetchie, to the SNP. McLetchie was elected on the Lothian regional list and the Conservatives only made a net loss of five seats, with leader Annabel Goldie claiming that their support had held firm. Prime Minister David Cameron congratulated the SNP on the result, but vowed to campaign for the Union in any independence referendum.

The Scottish Greens won two seats, including their co-convenor Patrick Harvie. Margo MacDonald again won election as an independent on the Lothian regional list. George Galloway, under a Unionist anti-cuts banner, failed to receive enough votes to be elected to the Glasgow regional list.

The SNP's overall majority assured Salmond of another term as First Minister, and he was reelected unopposed on 18 May.

|-
| style="background-color:white" colspan=15 | 
|-
! rowspan=2 colspan=2 | Party
! colspan=5 | Constituencies
! colspan=5 | Regional additional members
! colspan=5 | Total seats
|-
! Votes !! % !! ± !! Seats !! ± !! Votes !! % !! ± !! Seats !! ± !! Total !! ± !! %
|-

|-
|style="text-align:left"; colspan="2" | Valid votes || 1,989,276 || 99.7 || 3.8 || colspan="2"|   || 1,990,836 || 99.7 || 2.0 || colspan="5"|  
|-
|style="text-align:left"; colspan="2" | Spoilt votes || 6,363 || 0.3 || 3.8 || colspan="2"|   || 5,987 || 0.3 || 2.0 || colspan="5"|  
|-
!style="text-align:left"; colspan="2" | Total || 1,995,639 || 100 ||   || 73 || – || 1,996,823 || 100 ||   || 56 || – || 129 || – || 100
|-
|style="text-align:left"; colspan="2" | Electorate/Turnout || 3,950,626 || 50.5 || 3.4 || colspan="2"|   || 3,950,626 || 50.5 || 3.5 || colspan="5"|  
|}

Votes summary

Constituency and regional summary

Central Scotland

|-
! colspan=2 style="width: 200px"|Constituency
! style="width: 150px"|Elected member
! style="width: 300px"|Result
 
 
 
 
 
 
 
 
 

|-
! colspan="2" style="width: 150px"|Party
! Elected candidates
! style="width: 40px"|Seats
! style="width: 40px"|+/−
! style="width: 50px"|Votes
! style="width: 40px"|%
! style="width: 40px"|+/−%
|-

Glasgow

|-
! colspan=2 style="width: 200px"|Constituency
! style="width: 150px"|Elected member
! style="width: 300px"|Result
 
 
 
 
 
 
 
 
 

|-
! colspan="2" style="width: 150px"|Party
! Elected candidates
! style="width: 40px"|Seats
! style="width: 40px"|+/−
! style="width: 50px"|Votes
! style="width: 40px"|%
! style="width: 40px"|+/−%
|-

Highlands and Islands

|-
! colspan=2 style="width: 200px"|Constituency
! style="width: 150px"|Elected member
! style="width: 300px"|Result
 
 
 
 
 
 
 
 

|-
! colspan="2" style="width: 150px"|Party
! Elected candidates
! style="width: 40px"|Seats
! style="width: 40px"|+/−
! style="width: 50px"|Votes
! style="width: 40px"|%
! style="width: 40px"|+/−%
|-

Lothian

|-
! colspan=2 style="width: 200px"|Constituency
! style="width: 150px"|Elected member
! style="width: 300px"|Result
 

 

|-
! colspan="2" style="width: 150px"|Party
! Elected candidates
! style="width: 40px"|Seats
! style="width: 40px"|+/−
! style="width: 50px"|Votes
! style="width: 40px"|%
! style="width: 40px"|+/−%
|-

Mid Scotland and Fife

|-
! colspan=2 style="width: 200px"|Constituency
! style="width: 150px"|Elected member
! style="width: 300px"|Result
 
 
 
 
 
 
 
 
 

|-
! colspan="2" style="width: 150px"|Party
! Elected candidates
! style="width: 40px"|Seats
! style="width: 40px"|+/−
! style="width: 50px"|Votes
! style="width: 40px"|%
! style="width: 40px"|+/−%
|-

North East Scotland

|-
! colspan=2 style="width: 200px"|Constituency
! style="width: 150px"|Elected member
! style="width: 300px"|Result
 
 
 
 
 
 

|-
! colspan="2" style="width: 150px"|Party
! Elected candidates
! style="width: 40px"|Seats
! style="width: 40px"|+/−
! style="width: 50px"|Votes
! style="width: 40px"|%
! style="width: 40px"|+/−%
|-

South Scotland

|-
! colspan=2 style="width: 200px"|Constituency
! style="width: 150px"|Elected member
! style="width: 300px"|Result
 
 
 
 
 
 
 
 
 

|-
! colspan="2" style="width: 150px"|Party
! Elected candidates
! style="width: 40px"|Seats
! style="width: 40px"|+/−
! style="width: 50px"|Votes
! style="width: 40px"|%
! style="width: 40px"|+/−%
|-

West Scotland

|-
! colspan=2 style="width: 200px"|Constituency
! style="width: 150px"|Elected member
! style="width: 300px"|Result
 
 
 
 
 
 
 
 
 
 

|-
! colspan="2" style="width: 150px"|Party
! Elected candidates
! style="width: 40px"|Seats
! style="width: 40px"|+/−
! style="width: 50px"|Votes
! style="width: 40px"|%
! style="width: 40px"|+/−%
|-

Top target seats of the main parties
Below are listed all the constituencies which required a swing of less than 5% from the 2007 result to change hands. Because the election was fought under new boundaries, the figures are based on notional results from 2007.

SNP targets

Conservative targets

Labour targets

Liberal Democrat targets

Incumbents defeated

See also
Arbuthnott Commission
2011 National Assembly for Wales election
2011 Northern Ireland Assembly election
Murphy and Boyack review of the Labour Party in Scotland
2011 Scottish Labour Party leadership election
2011 Scottish Conservative Party leadership election
2011 Scottish Liberal Democrats leadership election

References

External links
 Election 2011 , a Briefing by the Scottish Parliament Information Centre
 Scottish Election Study

Party manifestos
 British National Party Manifesto
 Communist Party of Britain Manifesto
 Pirate Party UK Scottish Manifesto
 Respect Party 'Coalition Against Cuts' Manifesto
 Scottish Christian Party Manifesto
 Scottish Conservative Party Manifesto
 Scottish Green Party Manifesto
 Scottish Homeland Party Manifesto
 Scottish Labour Party Manifesto
 Scottish Liberal Democrats Manifesto
 Scottish National Party Manifesto
 Scottish Socialist Party Manifesto
 UK Independence Party Manifesto

Party election broadcasts
 Scottish National Party
 Scottish Labour Party
 Scottish Conservative Party
 Scottish Liberal Democrats
 Scottish Green Party
 British National Party
 UK Independence Party
 Scottish Christian Party
 Scottish Socialist Party
 All Scotland Pensioner's Party
 Socialist Labour Party

2011
Scottish Parliament election, 2011
Scottish Parliament election, 2011
2010s elections in Scotland
May 2011 events in the United Kingdom